Sergei Sergeyevich Shipulin (born 9 June 1978) is a Russian professional football coach and a former player.

Club career
He played 7 seasons in the Russian Football National League for FC Kuban Krasnodar, FC Lada-Tolyatti and FC Dynamo Makhachkala.

References

External links

1978 births
Sportspeople from Krasnodar
Living people
Russian footballers
Association football defenders
FC Kuban Krasnodar players
FC Lada-Tolyatti players
FC Chernomorets Novorossiysk players
FC Dynamo Makhachkala players